Gaurena nigrescens is a moth in the family Drepanidae. It is found in China (Sichuan).

References

Moths described in 1966
Thyatirinae